Hitch may refer to:

People 
 Hitch (surname)
 nickname of director Alfred Hitchcock (1899-1980)
 nickname of writer Christopher Hitchens (1949–2011)

Other uses
 Hitch, a knot used to attach a rope to a fixed object, see list of hitch knots
 Tow hitch, a construction on a truck or car to attach a trailer
 Hitches, fishes in the genus Lavinia including Lavinia exilicauda
 Hitch (route), a pattern run by a receiver in American football
 Hitch (film), a 2005 comedy film starring Will Smith
 Hitch (album), a 2016 album by The Joy Formidable
 Healthcare Interoperability Testing and Conformance Harmonisation, a 2010-2011 European Institute for Health Records project

See also
 Hitching (disambiguation)
 The Hitcher (disambiguation)